Dimitris Thanopoulos (born 26 August 1987 in Greece) is a Greek footballer playing as a midfielder.

Career
He started his career from the Olympiacos F.C. youth academy, and he has been capped with the Greek U-19 national team.

References 

1987 births
Living people
Greek footballers
Olympiacos F.C. players
Thrasyvoulos F.C. players
Panthrakikos F.C. players
Panachaiki F.C. players
Panetolikos F.C. players
A.P.S. Zakynthos players
Association football midfielders